The University of Dubai (UD) is an accredited university in the UAE. Licensed nationally by the Ministry of Higher Education and Scientific Research, UD became the first private University in Dubai to hold the AACSB international accreditation in 2009, maintaining for further 5 years till 2019, as well as the first private university in the UAE to hold the ABET-CAC accreditation for its Computing and Information Systems (BS) program in 2006. The curriculum is aligned with international professional certification bodies such as Institute of Leadership & Management (ILM)-UK, which awards BBA HRM and MBA Leadership and HRM graduates with level 5 and 7 certifications. Similarly, the curriculum is aligned with Islamic Economy, Smart City, Innovation and Entrepreneurship initiatives of the government with IBM partnership.

History 

The University of Dubai  was established in 1997 by the Dubai Chamber of Commerce and Industry (DCCI) to address skills and qualifications gaps in the workforce and to support the government's human resources development programs in the private and public sectors, at the time the university was recognized also as Dubai Polytechnic College. Graphic Design and Visual Communication were offered in the early years since its inception. The year 2001 was a turning point in the history of the University - recognized then as Dubai University College - when the Ministry of Higher Education and Scientific Research accredited the Bachelor of Business Administration (BBA) and the Bachelor of Science (BS) in Computing and Information Systems degree programs. In June 2006, Sheikh Mohammed bin Rashid Al Maktoum, Vice-President and Prime Minister of the UAE and the Ruler of Dubai, approved the name change from Dubai University College to University of Dubai.

Features
 University of Dubai joined United Nations Principles of Responsible Management Education (PRME) in 2008, becoming the first signatory form the Middle East region.  
 In 2013 UD was nominated as a member of the Champions Group of PRME.  UD hosted the 3rd PRME MENA regional conference at Dubai Chamber premises on 10 and 11 November 2013.
 The University of Dubai is sponsored by the Dubai Chamber of Commerce and Industry, .

Campus 

The University of Dubai's downtown campus is situated in the center of Dubai with some classes held in the Dubai Chamber in Deira, Dubai.

In June 2006 His Highness Sheikh Mohammed Bin Rashid Al Maktoum, Vice President and Prime Minister of the UAE and Ruler of Dubai, granted the university  of land in Academic City for construction of a new campus.

Students - 1400
Faculty - 300

Expansion of University of Dubai Campus (Phase 1) - 
The project initiated for the construction of nine buildings on an area of 273,387 sq.m in the Academic City on Dubai-Al Ain road. 
The project has been divided into two phases to accommodate 4,000 students in each phase - Total 8000+ Students Capacity
https://www.protenders.com/companies/university-of-dubai/projects/expansion-of-university-of-dubai-campus-phase-1

Academics

College of Business Administration(CBA) 
The college is accredited locally in the UAE by the Ministry of Higher Education & Scientific Research and internationally by the Association to Advance Collegiate Schools of Business (AACSB).

The college offers BBA degrees in eight majors: Management, Marketing, Finance and Banking, Accounting, Human Resources Management, Entrepreneurship Management, Business Economics and Supply Chain and Logistics Management.

College of Information Technology (CIT) 
The college offers a Computing and Information Systems program which is accredited locally in the UAE by the Ministry of Higher Education & Scientific Research and internationally by the Computing Accreditation Commission of the Accreditation Board for Engineering and Technology (ABET) in USA. The ABET accreditation was further maintained till 2020..

Center for Executive Development(CED) 

The Center for Executive Development (CED) is located in the heart of the city in the Dubai Chamber building. It is the continuing education arm of the University of Dubai.

CED has introduced online learning in March 2019 initiating with a course in Human Resource Management.

Confucius Institute at the University of Dubai 

The Confucius Institute at the University of Dubai, (CIUD) under the authorization of Hanban (Confucius Institute Headquarters), was established in 2011 jointly by the University of Dubai in the UAE and Ningxia University (one of the 100 key universities) in China. It is the first Confucius Institute established in the UAE and also the first in the GCC countries. It has a professional license issued by the Department of Economic Development and KHDA. CIUD is the only center authorized by Hanban to host the HSK tests of Chinese language in Dubai. It possesses a certificate as an HSK administrator and is certified by Chinese Testing International (CTI). CIUD is also the 140th Host Institute for the Confucius Institute Scholarship authorized by Hanban.

Center for Entrepreneurship and Innovation(CEI)

The Center for Entrepreneurship & Innovation (CEI), established under the University of Dubai's umbrella, is a research and consultancy platform operating in tandem with San Diego State University's Center for Information Convergence and Strategy (CICS). CEI offers a platform for students, alumni, and faculty to network, collaborate, & develop their ideas and support entrepreneurs through various stages of the entrepreneurial and innovation process.

University of Dubai Alumni Association 
The University of Dubai Alumni Association (UDAA) was established in May 2007, providing one association for all UD graduates.  A UD alumnus is anyone who has graduated from UD. UDAA membership is free of charge and alumni need only to keep their address and employment records up-to-date with Alumni Relations office.

External links 
 University of Dubai

References

 University of Dubai ‘Entrepreneurship and Innovation Center’ to open in January 2015  University of Dubai ‘Entrepreneurship and Innovation Center’ to open in January 2015
Dubai universities to expand campuses ahead of Expo 2020  Dubai universities to expand campuses ahead of Expo 2020
 Manipal Tapmi, University of Dubai to offer MBA programme  Manipal Tapmi, University of Dubai to offer MBA programme
 University of Dubai Selects Three Rivers Systems' CAMS Enterprise as Its Higher Education ERP System  University of Dubai Selects Three Rivers Systems' CAMS Enterprise as Its Higher Education ERP System
 IBM, University of Dubai ink deal for Smarter Cities Institute  IBM, University of Dubai ink deal for Smarter Cities Institute

Educational institutions established in 1997
Universities and colleges in Dubai
1997 establishments in the United Arab Emirates